Morrow County Airport  is a public airport located two miles southwest of Mount Gilead, Ohio, United States. It is owned and operated by the Morrow County Airport Authority.

Facilities and aircraft 
For the 12-month period ending July 31, 2013, the airport had 22,608 aircraft operations: 22,300 are general aviation, 100 are military and 208 are air taxi.

References

External links 

County airports in Ohio